Ellerby is a civil parish in the East Riding of Yorkshire, England.

The civil parish is formed by the hamlets of New Ellerby and Old Ellerby. According to the 2011 UK census, Ellerby parish had a population of 365, a decrease on the 2001 UK census figure of 393.

In 2020 the Ellerby Area Hoard was found during building renovations in a house in Ellerby parish. It is a hoard of 266 17th-18th century gold coins found in a stoneware vessel.

References

External links

Civil parishes in the East Riding of Yorkshire